is a Japanese company which specializes in the publication of trading cards, figures, CDs, and other general media related to the anime industry. Movic is a part of the Animate group.

Anime involved in
Ah! My Goddess: The Movie: Production
Ai City: Production
Ai Yori Aoshi: Production
Ai Yori Aoshi ~Enishi~: Production
All Purpose Cultural Cat Girl Nuku Nuku: Production
All Purpose Cultural Cat Girl Nuku Nuku DASH!: Production
Android Ana Maico 2010: Production
Anime Tenchou: Concept Work
Appleseed: Production
Araiso Private High School Student Council Executive Committee: Planning, Production
Battle Angel: Production
Blue Seed: Production
Blue Seed Beyond: Production
Bounty Dog: Production
Chobits: Production Cooperation
Clannad: Production
Clannad ~After Story~: ProductionCrystal Triangle: ProductionDengeki Oshioki Musume Gōtaman: Gōtaman Tanjō-hen: ProductionDescendants of Darkness: ProductionDNA²: ProductionDog Soldier: Shadows of the Past: ProductionFushigi Yuugi OVA: Producer
Gakusaver: Production
Galaxy Fraulein Yuna: Production
Galaxy Fraulein Yuna Returns: Production
Gall Force - Eternal Story: Production
Gall Force: The Revolution: Production
Gokicha!! Cockroach Girls: Production
Grandeek - Gaiden: Production
Gravitation: Production
Guyver: Out of Control: Production
Judge: Production
Jungle de Ikou!: Production
K-On!: Production
K-On!!:Production
K-On! Movie: Production
Kanon: Production
K.O Century Beast Warriors: Producer
Martian Successor Nadesico: Producer of Trading Cards
Neon Genesis Evangelion: Death & Rebirth: Production
The End of Evangelion: Production
Ninja Scroll: Production
Nuku Nuku: Production
Photon: The Idiot Adventures: Production
Plastic Little: Production
Pugyuru: Production
Roujin Z: Production
Sailor Victory: Production
s-CRY-ed: Producer of Trading Cards
Shamanic Princess: Production
Sorcerer Hunters: Production
Sorcerer Hunters: Co-Production
Sorcerous Stabber Orphen: Producer of Trading Cards
Star Ocean EX: Production
Starship Troopers: Production Cooperation
Strawberry Marshmallow: Production Collaboration
The Heroic Legend of Arslan: Production
This Ugly Yet Beautiful World: Production
Tokyo Babylon: Production
Tsubasa RESERVoir CHRoNiCLE The Movie: Princess of the Birdcage Kingdom: Production
Tsukihime, Lunar Legend: Production
Ultimate Teacher: Production
Umi no Yami, Tsuki no Kage: Production
Vampire Hunter D: Production
Vampire Hunter D: Bloodlust: Production
Wanna-Be's: Production
X Production
xxxHOLiC the Movie: A Midsummer Night's Dream: Production
Yebisu Celebrities 1st: Release
Yu Yu Hakusho the Movie: Poltergeist Report: Production

References

External links
Movic's official website 

Anime companies
Retail companies of Japan
Mass media in Tokyo